The 2007 Shanghai International Film Festival was the 10th such festival devoted to international cinema to be held in the city of Shanghai in the People's Republic of China. It was held from June 16 to June 24, 2007. It was one of twelve film festivals to be accredited in 2007 by the International Federation of Film Producers Association (FIAPF).

The festival was composed of three sections: the Golden Goblet (Jin Jue) competition, the Asian New Talent Section, and an International Panorama.

Films in competition

Juries

Golden Goblet 
 Chen Kaige (China) (head of jury)
 Fernando Trueba (Spain)
 Michael Ballhaus (Germany)
 Maria Grazia Cucinotta (Italy)
 Luc Jacquet (France)
 Lu Chuan (China)
 Kohei Oguri (Japan)

Asia New Talent 
 He Ping (China) (head of jury)
 Mabel Cheung (Hong Kong)
 Jean-Michel Frodon (France)
 Isao Yukisada (Japan)
 Apichatpong Weerasethakul (Thailand)

Awards

Golden Goblet
 Golden Goblet for Best Film
 According to the Plan, directed by Franziska Meletzky (Germany)
 Jury Grand Prix
The New Man, directed by Klaus Härö (Finland/Sweden)
 Golden Goblet for Best Director
 Tian Zhuangzhuang for The Go Master (China)
 Golden Goblet for Best Actor
 Juan José Ballesta for Doghead (Spain)
 Golden Goblet for Best Actress
 Corinna Harfouch, Dagmar Manzel, Kirsten Block, Christine Schorn for According To The Plan (Germany)
 Best Screenplay
Shemi Zarhin for Aviva My Love (Israel)
 Best Cinematography
 Wang Yu for The Go Master (China)
 Best Music
 Isao Tomita for Love and Honor (Japan)
 Special Award
 The Knot, directed by Yin Li (director) (China)

Asian New Talent Award
 Best Film
 Bliss directed by Sheng Zhimin
 Best Director
 Golam Rabbany Biplob for On the Wings of Dreams
 Audience Award
 The Case directed by Wang Fen

References

External links 
 10th Shanghai International Film Festival from the Internet Movie Database
 ('An Impressive Case' in 10th Shanghai International Film Festival)

Shanghai International Film Festival, 2007
Shanghai International Film Festival
Shanghai International Film Festival, 2007
Shanghai International Film Festival, 2007
21st century in Shanghai